Taddeo is a masculine given name which may refer to:

 Taddeo Alderotti (between 1206 and 1215-1295), Italian doctor and professor of medicine
 Taddeo Altini O.S.A. (1609-1685), Roman Catholic Bishop of Civita Castellana e Orte, and Titular Bishop of Porphyreon 
 Taddeo Barberini (1603–1647), Italian nobleman, Prince of Palestrina, nephew of Pope Urban VIII, Gonfalonier of the Church and commander of the Papal Army
 Taddeo Carlone (died 1613), Swiss-Italian sculptor and architect
 Taddeo Crivelli (fl. 1451, died by 1479), also known as Taddeo da Ferrara, painter of illuminated manuscripts
 Taddeo d'Este (c. 1390–1448), condottiere (mercenary leader) almost exclusively in the service of the Republic of Venice
 Taddeo da Suessa (1190/1200-1248), Italian jurist
 Taddeo di Bartolo, Sienese painter active up to 1422
 Taddeo Gaddi (c. 1300–1366), Italian painter
 Taddeo Gaddi (cardinal) (1520–1561), Italian Roman Catholic cardinal and bishop
 Taddeo Kuntze, Taddeo Polacco and Tadeusz Kuntze, pseudonyms of the Silesian painter Tadeusz Konicz (1733–1793)
 Taddeo Landini (c. 1561–1596), Italian sculptor and architect
 Taddeo Luigi dal Verme (1641-1717),  Roman Catholic cardinal
 Taddeo Lwanga (born 1994),  Ugandan footballer
 Taddeo Manfredi (1431–c. 1486), Lord of Imola from 1448 until 1473 and a condottiere (mercenary leader)
 Taddeo Orlando (1885–1950), Italian general
 Taddeo Pepoli (died 1549), Roman Catholic Bishop of Carinola, and of Cariati e Cerenzia
 Taddeo Sarti (1540-1617), Roman Catholic Bishop of Nepi e Sutri 
 Taddeo da Suessa or da Sessa (c. 1190/1200–1248), Italian jurist
 Taddeo Zuccari or Zuccaro (1529–1566), Italian painter

See also
 Tadeusz (disambiguation)
 Thaddeus

Italian masculine given names